Simon Knéfacz, or Simeon Knéfacz, alternative names Kniefacz, Šimon Knefac, Šimeon Kniefac (February 23, 1752 – August 3, 1819) was a Hungarian monk and Burgenland Croatian writer.

Born in Devínska Nová Ves near Bratislava (originally Mátyás Knéfacz), died in Klingenbach. He wrote three books in Burgenland Croatian. Knéfacz, along with Lőrinc Bogovich, Jeremiás Sosterich and Godfried Palkovich played a role in the standardization of the Burgenland Croatian language in the 18th century.

Works 
 Lapat evangeliumszki (Evangeliary), 1798
 Marianszko czvéche (Virgin's flower), 1803
 Vrata nebészka (Heavenly Gate), 1804

See also 
 Burgenland Croats

Literature 
 Nikola Benčić: Književnost gradišćanskih Hrvata, Zagreb 1998. 
 Ludwig Kuzmich: Kulturhistorische Aspekte der burgenlandkroatischen Druckwerke bis 1921 mit einer primären Bibliographie, Eisenstadt 1992.
 Paul Jos. Šafařík's Geschichte der südslawischen Literatur, Verlag von Friedrich Tempsky 1864. (pdf file)

External links 
 Das Auer Himmelstor 1857 - Cundravska Vrata nebeska

1752 births
1819 deaths
Burgenland Croats
Hungarian writers
Croatian writers
Hungarian Christian monks